Jeremy Harper is a Canadian politician, who was elected to the Yukon Legislative Assembly in the 2021 Yukon general election. He represents the electoral district of Mayo-Tatchun as a member of the Yukon Liberal Party.

A member of the Selkirk First Nation, he has served as a band councillor and recreation coordinator for the community and is a member of the Canadian Rangers.

Electoral record

References 

Living people
21st-century Canadian politicians
Yukon Liberal Party MLAs
First Nations politicians
Tutchone people
Year of birth missing (living people)